Steromphala divaricata, common name the divaricate gibbula, is a species of small sea snail, known as top snails or top shells, marine gastropod molluscs in the family Trochidae, the top snails.

Distribution
It is found in the Mediterranean Sea, the Adriatic Sea and the Black Sea.

Description
The length of the shell is between 12 mm and 24 mm and is 16 mm to 19 mm wide. The conoidal shell is imperforate or narrowly perforate. It is very thick and solid, cinereous.  The color of the shell is yellowish or green. It is longitudinally marked with rose-red lines, often oblique or broken into square dots. The spire is more or less elevated. Its outlines are rather convex. The six whorls are encircled by numerous lirulae, the upper ones flattened. The sutures are slightly impressed, but scalariform specimens with deep sutures are frequent. The body whorl is rounded at the periphery and on the base. The aperture is rounded-quadrate. The outer lip is bevelled to an edge, very thick and
smooth within. The pearly columella is straightened in the middle. The umbilicus is narrow or concealed.

References

 Costa O. G., 1829: Catalogo sistematico e ragionato de' testacei delle Due Sicilie; Tipografia della Minerva, Napoli 8 + 132 p., pl. 1-3
 Brusina S., 1866: Contribuzione pella fauna dei molluschi dalmati; Verhandlungen der Kaiserlich-königlichen Zoologisch-botanisch Gesellschaft in Wien 16: 1-134
 Coen G., 1937: Nuovo saggio di una sylloge molluscorum Adriaticorum; Memoria Reale Comitato Talassografico Italiano 240, 1–173, 10 pls
 Gofas, S.; Le Renard, J.; Bouchet, P. (2001). Mollusca, in: Costello, M.J. et al. (Ed.) (2001). European register of marine species: a check-list of the marine species in Europe and a bibliography of guides to their identification. Collection Patrimoines Naturels, 50: pp. 180–213
 Kantor Yu.I. & Sysoev A.V. (2006) Marine and brackish water Gastropoda of Russia and adjacent countries: an illustrated catalogue. Moscow: KMK Scientific Press. 372 pp. + 140 pls.

External links
 
 Linnaeus, C. (1758). Systema Naturae per regna tria naturae, secundum classes, ordines, genera, species, cum characteribus, differentiis, synonymis, locis. Editio decima, reformata [10th revised edition, vol. 1: 824 pp. Laurentius Salvius: Holmiae]
 Payraudeau B. C., 1826: Catalogue descriptif et méthodique des Annelides et des Mollusques de l'île de Corse; Paris pp. 218 + 8 pl.
 Costa O. G. (1830 ["1829") Catalogo sistematico e ragionato de' testacei delle Due Sicilie. Tipografia della Minerva, Napoli. pp. 1-8, i-cxxxii, pl. 1-3]
 Monterosato T. A. (di), 1888-1889: Molluschi del Porto di Palermo. Specie e varietà; Bullettino della Società Malacologica Italiana, Pisa 13 (1888[1889?): 161-80 14 (1889): 75-81]

divaricata
Gastropods described in 1758
Taxa named by Carl Linnaeus